The 201st (Toronto Light Infantry) Battalion, CEF was a unit in the Canadian Expeditionary Force during the First World War.  Based in Toronto, Ontario, the unit began recruiting during the winter of 1915/16 in that city.  The battalion was disbanded while still in Canada, and its men were transferred to the 170th (Mississauga Horse) Battalion, CEF and 198th (Canadian Buffs) Battalion, CEF in September 1916.  The 201st (Toronto Light Infantry) Battalion, CEF had one Officer Commanding: Lieut-Col. E. W. Hagarty.

From The T.L.I. Gazette, the memorial publication of the 201st Battalion CEF (date of publication unknown):

"The 201st Battalion was almost 550 strong at the time of its dismemberment and it is calculated that about 500 went overseas. Most of these reached France and the firing line, and about the first to have the experience of front line work were a draft of 48 who went to the 75th Bn. in December 1916, and a similar draft who went to the 58th Bn. about the same date. Altogether there were nine infantry units that received members of the old battalion. These were the 3rd, 19th, 20th, 58th, 72nd, 75th, 102nd and 116th Battalions, and the 2nd C.M.R. Others served with Artillery, heavy and field and when the Machine Gun battalions were formed in the spring of '18, some of the boys found their way into them. Others managed to "wangle" the much coveted transfer into the Royal Flying Corps. Two attained captaincies in the R.F.C., Tracey, our former bandmaster, and W.A. Leslie, Annis, H.T. Leslie, J.H. White, Jones, Heakes, Crawford, Leary, Pinnock, Curtis, Henderson, Ferguson, and Harvey were all Flight-Lieutenants and Miles and J.G. Johnston were cadets. Lieuts. Annis, Curtis and Pinnock were killed.

Of the infantry units the 72nd proved the most unlucky for our boys; only three went to it and of these, A.J. McFarquhar is the sole survivor, the other two, H. Bain and H. Davey being killed. And the 2nd C.M.R. bunch were the most fortunate, all of them returning safe if not sound. Altogether the battalion suffered a loss of 74 killed in action or died of wounds or sickness, and to commemorate these lads who thus gave their lives for their country is the main purpose of this publication."

There follows a list of the fallen (notes on how they died, where known, are excerpted from the publication):

W.F. Annis, went to the 58th battalion in October 1916 and after being wounded was sent to Canada to join the Royal Flying Corps and was killed there in practice.

D. Abbot, joined the 75th December 1916 and was killed at Vimy.

M.H. Archer, H. Baber, J.A. Baxter, W.H.F. Atkin,

D.C. Bates, was in the 58th and was killed at the Mericourt front

W.H. Bennett,

N.J. Brown, "Jack" was killed in a raid just before Vimy. He was in the 58th.

W.E.A. Brown, "Alway" joined the 75th in February 1918; he was wounded July 20, 1918 and killed in action near Arras September 4 of the same year.

D.B. Carr, W. Colquhoun,

R.J.D. Conklin, "Bob" went to the 19th battalion with a draft from the 198th when the Fifth Division was broken up, and was wounded at Arras August 16, 1918, dying of his wounds in No. 1 CCS three days after.

W. Craig, went to the 75th in December 1916 and was killed September 2nd, 1918.

F.W. Curtis, F.W. Davie, H. Davey,

A. Dyson, also was with the 75th and was killed March 1917.

B.A. Earnshaw, was killed at Cambrai 1 October 1918

H.W. Ellis, G.H. Ewens, G.H. Forrester,

H.C. Fogarty, was killed at Arras August 1918

E.A. Fryers, went on to the 20th battalion in April 1917, was wounded in July, but rejoined his unit in November, and was killed in action January 26th, 1918

J.L. Gloves, H.J. Goodyear,

G. Hadden,  was killed at Cambrai 1 October 1918

F.W.B. Hall,

C. Hewson, was killed at Vimy and is buried at Vimy Ridge

B.S. Heath, R.J. Hipkiss, W. Hollinger,

A.E. Hogarth,  was killed with the 75th, 1 March 1917

R.C. James, E. Johns, J.L. Johnson, E.F. Johnson,

R. Kerr, was killed with the 75th 1 March 1917

S.H. Kensett,

J.H. Laurence, was killed on the Mericourt front 17 September 1917

F. Ledrew, who went to the 198th was rejected as physically unfit when his unit went overseas. He signed up, however, with the Army Service Corps and finally got to France with the 8th Canadian Railway Troops in October, 1917. He was killed March 5th 1918 and is buried at Bailleul, France.

B. Lillew, who was a bugler with the 201st got to France in early 1917 with the 116th battalion. He was a Company Runner until August 8, 1918, when he was killed in the Amiens battle. He is buried in the village of Domart on the Amiens-Roye road.

F. Lomas,

R.F. Lowrie, was only 16 when he joined the 201st battalion. He was a company runner when he was killed on the 12th May, 1918 and is buried at Bellacourt.

H. Mitchell, "Hal" went to the 58th and was killed summer of 1917.

J.P. Mitcheson, was killed with the 75th on that fatal day, the 1st March 1917.

J. Meridew, W.H. Moffatt, J.M. Moir,

G.B. Morgan, was killed with the 75th on the 1st March 1917.

H.C. Moore, A.P. McDonald, A. McComb,

A.G. McConnell, was killed at Cambrai Sept 30th, 1918

- McNutt, G. Noble, J. Oakley,

G. Parker, (75th) was killed April 4, 1917

C. Pinnock,

L.B. Ramsay, (75th) was wounded on the 1st March 1917 when Col. Beckett and so many of the 75th were killed, but recovered and returned to duty after some months in England. He was killed in the Amiens sector, Aug. 22nd, 1918.

W.F. Ramsden, R.W. Rowswell, R. Robertson,

W.J. Searle, was killed with the 58th in the spring of 1917 at Mt. St. Eloi, and is buried there.

F.G. Stockil, 75th, was wounded in the knee Aug 4th, 1917, but rejoined and was killed on the Lens front Aug 15th of the same year.

S. Smith, "Stanley" also was with the 19th battalion. He was wounded May 12, 1918 and died the same day at No. 29., CCS. He is buried in Bayneux Imperial cemetery, Doullens.

G.C. Taylor, went to the 19th battalion. He was wounded near Arras on Aug. 16th, 1918 and died on Aug. 21st.

G.A. Tucker, W.G. Tyrrell, J.W. Ward, R.S. Waldron, - Walker, F.E. Warner, G. Wesley, A.D. White, J. Woodgate,

H. Worthington went to the Divisional Signaller when the 201st was broken up and went overseas in November 1916. He went to France in April 1917 and was a lineman with the 1st Artillery Brigade HQ when he was killed at Hill 70, July 31, 1917.

Further commentary from one contributor to the publication:

"But our narrative concerns particularly those who went to the "Horses" (170th Mississauga Horse Battalion) ...

Proceeding overseas in October 1916, two drafts went to France reinforcing the 75th and 58th battalions. The remainder of the 170th was drafted into the 169th battalion and, after a short stay in that unit, the majority transferred to the 116th Battalion. Crossing the Channel with that unit, they landed in Boulogne, France on February 11, 1917.

The battalion proceeded immediately up the line and taking the place of the 60th battalion in the third division 9th Brigade, fought through all the engagements in which that division took part in 1917 and 1918. Prominent among these shows were Vimy, Avion, Lens, Passchendaele, Amiens, Arras and Cambrai. The 201st fellows, some forty-one in number, played an important part in their unit, many winning promotions and six being awarded decorations for bravery on the field.

But we would pay tribute to those who made the supreme sacrifice, who died gallantly in action, happy in the thought that they had done what they could and that they were giving their lives for others."

References
Meek, John F. Over the Top! The Canadian Infantry in the First World War. Orangeville, Ont.: The Author, 1971.

The T.L.I. Gazette the official record of the Toronto Light Infantry 201st Battalion C.E.F. Memorial Number (12 November 1919?)

Battalions of the Canadian Expeditionary Force
Military units and formations of Ontario